The  is a tilting diesel multiple unit (DMU) train type operated by Shikoku Railway Company (JR Shikoku) on limited express services in Shikoku, Japan. An identical lone 4-car set is also operated by the Tosa Kuroshio Railway.

Variants
TSE 2000 series (1989–2018)
2000 series (since 1990)
N2000 series (since 1995)

Technical specifications
The trains use stainless steel car bodies, and are powered by SA6D125-H engines. The tilting system uses active pendular suspensions.

History
The prototype TSE ("Trans-Shikoku Experimental") set was introduced in 1989, and was the recipient of the 1990 Laurel Prize. Full-production sets followed in 1990. An improved version, designated as N2000, was introduced in 1995. These sets feature a higher power output.

The TSE prototype set was withdrawn from revenue service in March 2018. 2000 series trains are gradually being replaced by new 2700 series trains since 2020.

Operations 
2000/N2000 series trains are currently used on the following services:

 Ashizuri (Kōchi - Sukumo)
 Uwakai (Matsuyama - Uwajima)

References

External links

JR Shikoku vehicle information 

2000 series
2000 series
Tilting trains
Train-related introductions in 1989
Fuji rolling stock